Ron Fitzpatrick (born 27 May 1940) is a former  Australian rules footballer who played with North Melbourne in the Victorian Football League (VFL).

Notes

External links 

Living people
1940 births
Australian rules footballers from Victoria (Australia)
North Melbourne Football Club players
Coburg Football Club players